Mugurel Mihai Buga (born 16 December 1977), nicknamed "Pele" by the fans, is a Romanian former  professional footballer who played as a forward.

On 31 December 2009, he was declared a free agent by LPF. On 8 January 2010 he agreed terms with Skoda Xanthi, where he played until the summer of 2011, before returning to his youth club FC Brașov on 15 July.

Honours
FC Brașov
 Liga II: 1998–99

Rapid București
 Cupa României: 2005–06, 2006–07
 Supercupa României: 2007

References

External links
 
 
 

1977 births
Living people
Sportspeople from Brașov
Romanian footballers
Romania international footballers
Association football forwards
Liga I players
Liga II players
Liga III players
FC Brașov (1936) players
FC Rapid București players
CSM Corona Brașov footballers
Super League Greece players
Xanthi F.C. players
Romanian expatriate footballers
Romanian expatriate sportspeople in Greece
Expatriate footballers in Greece